Markus Nordlund (born July 27, 1985) is a Finnish ice hockey player who currently plays professionally at Vaasan Sport.

Career 
After playing for the Lukko youth teams, Nordlund logged his first minutes in Finnland’s top-division Liiga during the 2005-06 season with Lukko.

In 2008, he transferred to fellow Liiga team HC TPS and won the Finnish championship with the club in 2010. After the 2010-11 season, which he also spent with HC TPS, Nordlund was presented with the Juha Rantasila Trophy as the top-scoring defenseman of the league.

From 2011 to 2013, he played with Jokerit Helsinki, before moving to HC Ambrì-Piotta of the Swiss NLA in September 2013. He was brought in to replace injured Maxim Noreau and then stayed with the team for the remainder of the season. In December 2013, he strengthened the roster of Genève-Servette HC at the Spengler Cup and helped win the title, while being named to the Spengler Cup All Star Team.

The 2014-15 season saw him skate in the Swedish Hockey League with Djurgårdens IF.

Nordlund returned to HC Ambrì-Piotta in November 2015. He then signed with Vaasan Sport of the Finnish Liiga for the 2016-17 season.

International career 
Nordlund made his debut with Finnland's national team during the 2010 Euro Hockey Tour.

Career statistics

References

External links

Living people
HC TPS players
1985 births
Djurgårdens IF Hockey players
HC Ambrì-Piotta players
Krefeld Pinguine players
Lukko players
KalPa players
Jokerit players
Vaasan Sport players
Finnish ice hockey defencemen